Forsythia koreana, commonly called gaenari (Hangul:개나리) or Korean goldenbell tree, is a species in the olive family, Oleaceae. The front of the leaf is dark green and the back is dark blue, but both sides are hairless.

References 

Endemic flora of Korea
Flora of Korea
Forsythieae